Trajkovski (feminine: Trajkovska) is a Macedonian surname, it may refer to:
 Aleksandar Trajkovski, Macedonian footballer
 Blagojče Trajkovski, Macedonian handball player
 Bojan Trajkovski, Macedonian basketball player
 Boris Trajkovski, Macedonian politician
 Dejan Trajkovski, Slovenian footballer
 Igor Trajkovski, Macedonian basketball player
 Michael Trajkovski, Macedonian-Australian footballer
 Pece Trajkovski – Brada, Macedonian musician
 Robert Trajkovski, Macedonian-Australian footballer
 Romana Trajkovska, Macedonian footballer

Macedonian-language surnames